Stamnodes topazata is a species of geometrid moth in the family Geometridae. It is found in North America.

The MONA or Hodges number for Stamnodes topazata is 7349.

Subspecies
These four subspecies belong to the species Stamnodes topazata:
 Stamnodes topazata albida Barnes & McDunnough, 1912
 Stamnodes topazata apicata Barnes & McDunnough
 Stamnodes topazata arctica Thierry-Mieg, 1911
 Stamnodes topazata topazata

References

Further reading

External links

 

Stamnodini
Articles created by Qbugbot
Moths described in 1899